The Clore Duffield Foundation is a registered charity in the United Kingdom. It was founded in 2000 by the merger of two charitable foundations, the Clore Foundation of Charles Clore and  his daughter's Vivien Duffield Foundation.

Formation
After her father's death in 1979, Duffield assumed the Chairmanship of the Clore Foundation in the UK and in Israel. In the UK she also established her own Vivien Duffield Foundation in 1987, and the two foundations merged in 2000.

Museums and galleries

The Foundation has supported a wide range of organisations including the Royal Opera House, Tate, the Royal Ballet, the British Museum, the Natural History Museum, Dulwich Picture Gallery, the Southbank Centre, the Tower of David Museum in Jerusalem, Israel and Eureka! The National Children's Museum. The Foundation has made a particular contribution to cultural education, having funded dozens of Clore Learning Centres across the UK, and to leadership training, having launched the Clore Leadership Programme for the cultural sector in 2003 and the Clore Social Leadership Programme in 2008.

JW3
The Foundation initiated and provided most of the funding for the JW3 Jewish cultural centre in London.

Leadership Programme
The Clore Leadership Programme provides professional training and personal development for British professionals in the cultural sector.  It was founded in 2002.

Each year around 25 Clore Fellows are selected for a seven to eight  month training programme in fundraising, media training, financial planning, and personal development.  They also participate in extended secondments to organisations outside their previous professional experiences.  Each Fellowship is individually tailored and the each Fellow receives support by a Mentor and individual coaching.

In addition, each Fellow can submit a proposal to undertake research once they have completed their Fellowship, which is funded by the Arts and Humanities Research Council and supervised by a Higher Education Institute.

Since 2006, the Programme has also offered short courses to a greater number of participants which capture a lot of the Clore experience in an intensive two-week residential course.  It also offers training for members of Boards of Directors of cultural organisations.

Leadership
The founding Director of the Clore Leadership Programme was Chris Smith, who from 1997 to 2001 had been Secretary of State for Culture, Media and Sport.  In July 2008 he was succeeded as Director by Sue Hoyle. The current Chair is Sir John Tusa. Hilary S Carty has served as Executive Director of the programme since September 2017.

Notable alumni
Kenneth Tharp: Chief Executive, The Place
Gus Casely-Hayford: Curator and cultural historian
Nick Merriman: Director of Manchester Museum
Erica Whyman: Chief Executive of Northern Stage, Newcastle upon Tyne
Kathleen Soriano: Independent arts curator, writer and television broadcaster

Other activities
Clore Social identifies, connects and develops leaders through its fully funded fellowship programme and works with people, partners and funders across all sectors to offer a holistic approach to developing leaders for social impact. So far, 101 fellows have joined its network. It is run by a small staff team from its office in Kings Cross, London.

References

External links
Clore Leadership Programme
Clore Duffield Foundation
"Culture Club", The Guardian, 16 June 2005.
"Observations: Clore Leadership Programme provides a step up for future Royal Ballet supremos", The Independent, 31 July 2009.
"MLA Clore Fellows", MLA, 7 October 2010.
"Finding the culture sector's leaders of tomorrow", Guardian Culture Professionals Network, 14 December 2011.

Foundations based in the United Kingdom
Cultural education
Arts organizations
Management education